The South Africa Tour 2013 was a tour by Welsh singer Bonnie Tyler, and marked 20 years since her concert in the country. The tour was widely reported by South African media and followed the release of her album Rocks and Honey (2013) and her appearance on the Eurovision Song Contest 2013. The first two shows in Johannesburg both sold out. It was announced upon her visit that her new album will be released in South Africa "very soon".

Tyler only performed four new songs from Rocks and Honey in her concerts; "This Is Gonna Hurt", "All I Ever Wanted", "Flat On the Floor" and "Mom". "Everybody likes to hear the classics," Tyler explained.

Background

After her concert in Bloemfontein, Tyler and her band visited tourist sites near Cape Town, such as Table Mountain and wine farms around Stellenbosch.

Tour dates

Band
 Matt Prior - guitar
 Keith Atack - guitar
 Ed Poole - bass guitar
 John Young - keyboard
 Grahame Rolfe - drums

References

Bonnie Tyler concert tours
2013 concert tours